John Newton Williamson (November 8, 1855August 29, 1943) was an American rancher and politician in the state of Oregon. A native Oregonian, he served in both chambers of the Oregon Legislative Assembly representing central and eastern Oregon in the late 19th century. A Republican, he then served in Congress from 1903 to 1907 and was involved in the Oregon land fraud scandal.

Early life
John Williamson was born in Lane County, near Junction City in the Oregon Territory on November 8, 1855, to Joseph and Minerva Williamson. He earned his education at the local schools of Salem and then at Willamette University in that city. Williamson married Sarah V. Forrest in Albany and they had three children. In 1876, he moved to Eastern Oregon and started in the livestock trade in Wasco and Crook counties. He also owned and edited the Prineville Review in Crook county from 1893 to 1896.

Political career

In 1886, he was selected as sheriff of Crook County, serving in that office until 1888. That year he was elected to serve the county in the Oregon House of Representatives. In 1898, he returned to the House as a Republican during a special session of the legislature and returned for the 1899 session. Williamson was elected to the Oregon State Senate in 1900 and served in the 1901 and 1903 sessions, but not the special session in 1903. Williamson represented Crook, Klamath, Lake and Wasco counties, and served as president pro tempore of the Senate in 1901.

He was elected as a Republican to the United States House of Representatives from Oregon and served from March 4, 1903, to March 3, 1907. He declined to run for re-election in 1906. In 1905, Williamson was convicted along with Oregon senator John H. Mitchell and other co-conspirators on crimes involving political corruption and the illegal acquisition of public lands in the Oregon land fraud scandal. His conviction was overturned in 1908 by the United States Supreme Court in Williamson v. United States, 207 U.S. 425, 28 S. Ct. 163. The court remanded the case for a new trial, but no new trial occurred.

Later years
After leaving Congress he returned to Crook County and raising livestock and other agricultural activities. Williamson returned to public life in 1922, when he was appointed as the postmaster for Prineville, serving in the position until 1934. John Newton Williamson died on August 29, 1943, at the age of 87 in Prineville where he was buried at the Masonic Cemetery.

References

External links

1855 births
1943 deaths
Republican Party members of the Oregon House of Representatives
Republican Party Oregon state senators
Willamette University alumni
Oregon postmasters
Oregon sheriffs
People from Prineville, Oregon
People from Junction City, Oregon
Republican Party members of the United States House of Representatives from Oregon
Ranchers from Oregon